Donald Colin Hollett (born December 28, 1935) was a Canadian politician. He represented the electoral district of Burin-Placentia West in the Newfoundland and Labrador House of Assembly from 1979 to 1982. He was a member of the Liberal Party of Newfoundland and Labrador.

References

1935 births
Living people
Liberal Party of Newfoundland and Labrador MHAs